The Boston Red Sox, a professional baseball franchise in Major League Baseball (MLB), has given the title of captain to select players since the team's inaugural season as a member of the American League in 1901 (the team was known as the Boston Americans through the 1907 season). For various seasons during the team's history, the position has been vacant; while in early baseball a captain was responsible for many of the functions now assumed by managers and coaches, the title is purely honorary in modern professional baseball. Since the end of World War II, only three players have served as captain of the Red Sox. The most recent was catcher Jason Varitek, who was captain during the 2005–2011 seasons, and wore a distinctive "C" on the left side of his jersey, similar to captains in the National Hockey League.

Captains 

The history of Red Sox captains was researched by baseball historian Howard W. Rosenberg in 2004. The Red Sox front office contacted Rosenberg in advance of Jason Varitek being named captain, after learning that Rosenberg, author of a 2003 book featuring captains in 19th-century baseball, had disputed the official count of captains in New York Yankees franchise history.

Notes 
  Served as acting captain for one game.

References 

captains
Sports captains